"Song of the Open Road" is a poem by Walt Whitman from his 1856 collection Leaves of Grass. It has 15 sections, each with 3-4 stanzas.

Synopsis 
The poem can be split in two parts, Sections 1-8 and Sections 9-15.

Key Concepts 
The historical context found in “Song of The Open Road” is describing the westward expansion of the United States, “ an era characterized by the call of adventure and opportunity for those courageous enough make the journey west, i.e. to follow the open road,” (Kreidler). Kreidler discussed how Whitman was greatly influenced by politics and political movements. Using the westward expansion as inspiration in this piece allowed for Whitman’s audience to better understand and relate to this poem.
Whitman also incorporates some religious contexts, like referencing Swedenborgianism. Kreidler explains that, “Swedenborgianism espoused a belief that a spiritual component existed within every living and material being. Swedenborg also believed that every part of the body held a particular communication with the Divine.” In Whitman’s poem the readers can see this belief when he starts to introduce the “Song” in Section 7, “Here is the efflux of the soul; / The efflux of the soul comes from within through embower'd gates, ever provoking questions.”

Symbolism 
In Whitman’s poem, the reader can find symbolism through the journey of life and the open, democratic society of that time. In the first 8 sections of the poem, Whitman observes the freedoms in life shown through the open road, “Afoot and light-hearted I take to the open road; Healthy, free, the world before me; The long brown path before me leading wherever I choose.” Whitman wants his readers to feel free while reading this, and he wants them to know that he wrote this poem to ensure the feeling of freedom upon them.

The Ending
Whitman ends his poem “with the persona awaiting an affirmative response from his reader” (Kummings). The narrator in his poem reaches his hand out to the reader and asks them to join him on the journey. Whitman added this as his poem ending to make the reader question, “will they join him on this journey through the open road?”(Kummings). It is almost as if the narrator doesn’t want to complete the journey of life on his own; he wants the company. This is not a common approach in poem endings, but Whitman also wants to make his readers question, “do you want to complete the journey alone, or do you want to accompany someone for the rest of your life's journey?” By leaving his readers questioning their life choices, Whitman is able to help them figure out their life in a way.

References

 
 
 

1856 poems
Poetry by Walt Whitman